Fred Hulme (birth unknown – death unknown) was a professional rugby league footballer who played in the 1950s. He played at club level for Featherstone Rovers (Heritage № 322).

Playing career
Hulme made his début for Featherstone Rovers on Saturday 17 February 1951, and he played his last match for Featherstone Rovers during the 1955–56  season.

Challenge Cup Final appearances
Hulme played right-, i.e. number 12, in Featherstone Rovers' 12-18 defeat by Workington Town in the 1952 Challenge Cup Final during the 1951–52 season at Wembley Stadium, London on Saturday 19 April 1952.

Testimonial match
Hulme's benefit season at Featherstone Rovers took place during the 1955–56 season.

References

External links

Search for "Hulme" at rugbyleagueproject.org
A FEATHERSTONE ROVERS BLOG: March 2012
A FEATHERSTONE ROVERS BLOG: Testimonials and Benefit Seasons.

English rugby league players
Featherstone Rovers players
Place of birth missing
Place of death missing
Rugby league second-rows
Year of birth missing
Year of death missing